Mrs. Universe is an annual international event for "the most honorable married woman". The event is open to married, divorced, and widowed women from nations on all continents around the world, who are between the ages of 18 and 55, have a family and career, and are involved in a "significant cause". It is based in Sofia, Bulgaria.

The organizer, Mrs. Universe Ltd., also organizes the Mrs. Europe, Grandma Universe, and Children of the Universe pageants.

The current and reigning queen and titleholder, Mrs. Universe 2022, is Elena Maksimova from Russia.

Titleholders
The organization called 2022 their 45th year on all promotional materials, though public recording of winners goes back to 2007. The following is the list of known winners of this event.

Countries by number of title wins

Controversies

Comparison with Miss Universe 
The Mrs. Universe organization was sued in 2010 by the Miss Universe organization for an alleged breach of trademark. The Mrs. pageant countered that "Universe" is a generic word, and pointed out that the Mrs. pageant is exclusively for married women while the Miss pageant is for unmarried women. The Mrs. organization opined that the lawsuit was part of a conspiracy by human traffickers to stop the pageant, because Mrs. Universe held an awareness campaign about human trafficking.
Five years after, the Miss Universe organization again threatened legal action against Mrs. Universe for breach of trademark. This came on the tails of comments made by the first Indigenous woman to ever win a Universe title, Ashley Callingbull-Burnham, when she criticized the Canadian government's lack of support of First Nations people.

The Mrs. Universe pageant has continued to run despite this controversy, arguing that it is a pageant for married, divorced, and widowed women while the Miss Universe pageant is restricted to women who have never been married. Beginning in 2023, however, the Miss Universe Organization will allow married or pregnant women to compete in the pageant. Accepting married contestants reinvigorates tension between the American-based Miss Universe pageant and the European-based Mrs. Universe pageant, which was previously the only avenue for married women to compete for the Universe title. However, distinction between the two pageants still exists, where Mrs. Universe allows contestants up to 55 years of age, while Miss Universe remains restricted to women under 28 even if they are married.

See also 
 List of beauty contests
 Mrs. World
 Mrs. Globe

References

External links 

 
 

2007 establishments in Bulgaria
Organizations based in Sofia
Recurring events established in 2007
Beauty pageants for married contestants
International beauty pageants